Meherpur (pron: meɦeɾpuɾ) is the northwestern district of Khulna Division in southwestern Bangladesh. It is bordered by the Indian state of West Bengal to the west, and by the Bangladeshi districts of Kushtia and Chuadanga to the east. Pre-independence Meherpur was a subdivision of Nadia district.

History
According to Ashraf Siddiqui, the district is named after the 16th century dervish Meher Ali Shah. 

The Provisional Government of Bangladesh was formed and solemnly sworn in Meherpur's Baidyanathtala village (later renamed as Mujibnagar), on 17 April 1971 under the leadership of Tajuddin Ahmed and Syed Nazrul Islam. The entire Proclamation ceremony was organised by local leaders under the supervision of Momeen Chowdhury and MM Rustom Ali. After that day on 18 April 1971, the Pakistani Army killed 8 people in Amjhupi village. Meherpur became a district in 1983.

Administration
Meherpur district is divided into three upazilas: Gangni Upazila, Meherpur Sadar Upazila and Mujibnagar Upazila.
Meherpur is a district located in the southwestern part of Bangladesh. With an area of approximately 716 square kilometers and a population of over 0.8 million people, Meherpur is a major center of agriculture and commerce in the region. The district headquarters is located in the town of Meherpur, which is also the largest town in the district.

Meherpur is known for its rich cultural heritage and historical significance. The district is home to several ancient ruins and monuments, including the ruins of the Hindu Kingdom of Bikrampur and the historic temple of Shat Gombuj Mosque, which is one of the oldest and largest mosques in Bangladesh. Meherpur is also known for its colorful and vibrant festivals, including the annual Baruni Mela, which is held in honor of the Hindu god, Shiva.

Agriculture is the backbone of Meherpur's economy, with a large portion of the population engaged in farming and related activities. The district is known for its fertile land and favorable climate, which allows for the production of a variety of crops, including rice, wheat, and jute. In recent years, the district has also seen significant growth in the non-agricultural sector, with the establishment of several small and medium-sized enterprises in the area.

Meherpur is known for its natural beauty, with many scenic lakes and rivers, as well as lush green forests and rolling hills. The district is home to several wildlife sanctuaries, including the Kanaighat Wildlife Sanctuary, with a multitude of species therein.

Meherpur had a poor infrastructure and inadequate public services. The district is also prone to frequent natural disasters, such as floods and cyclones, which can cause widespread damage and loss of life.

Demographics

According to the 2011 Bangladesh census, Meherpur District had a population of 655,392, of which 324,634 were males and 330,758 females. Rural population was 571,999 (87.28%) and urban population was 83,393 (12.72%). Meherpur had a literacy rate of 46.27% for the population 7 years and above: 46.87% for males and 45.69% for females.

Muslims formed 97.77% of the population, Hindus 1.20%, and Christians 1.01%. Other religions were 0.02%.

Economy
Main sources of income: Agriculture 68.95%, non-agricultural labourer 3.24%, industry 0.87%, commerce 13.83%, transport and communication 2.21%, service 3.81%, construction 1.03%, religious service 0.14%, rent and remittance 0.59% and others 5.33%.

See also
 Mujibnagar Upazila
 Districts of Bangladesh

References

 
Districts of Bangladesh